The Sunset League is a high school athletic conference in Orange County, California affiliated with the CIF Southern Section.
The first season was 1937-38 with the charter members Anaheim High School, Huntington Beach High School, Newport Harbor High School, Orange High School, Jordan High School (Long Beach), and Excelsior High School. The name "Sunset" was selected from a list of 16 suggested names at the first league meeting on April 26, 1937 at Anaheim High School. Other names considered were Pacific, Little Six, Mission, Central, Bi County, Santa Ana Valley, Orla (Orange-Los Angeles), Olympic, Suburban, Valencia, Olac (Orange-Los Angeles counties), Piedmont, Padre, Monte Vista, and Del Mar

24 different schools have been members over the 85 seasons of competition led by Huntington Beach at 78 years thru the 2021-22 term. Marina has been a member for 58 seasons, Newport Harbor 55, Edison 48, and Fountain Valley 48 seasons. Not all years of membership have been continuous.

Other current members (with seasons as a Sunset Member) Los Alamitos (30), Corona del Mar (4), and Laguna Beach (4).

Sports
Beginning in 2018-19 season , the league is now the Sunset Conference for a number of sports with Surf League (stronger teams)  and the Wave League.  The four schools in each league will change every couple of years based on league standings.

Current Sport Offerings (* = Surf and Wave Leagues)

FALL:
Boys Cross Country *
Girls Cross Country *
Football  (Marina and Laguna Beach participate in the Golden West Conference)
Girls Golf *
Girls Tennis *
Girls Volleyball *
Boys Water Polo *

WINTER * :
Boys Basketball, Girls Basketball, Boys Soccer, Girls Soccer, Girls Water Polo, Boys Wrestling, Girls Wrestling

SPRING: 
Baseball *, Girls Beach Volleyball, Boys Diving, Girls Diving, Boys Golf *, Boys Lacrosse, Girls Lacrosse, Softball *, Girls Swimming *, Boys Swimming *, Boys Tennis *, Girls Track and Field *, Boys Track and Field *, Boys Volleyball *

References

CIF Southern Section leagues